Scotland's Hot 20 (The Hot 20) is the name of a Scottish syndicated radio programme  hosted by Greigsy.
 
It is produced from Clyde 1's studios in Glasgow, 
airing Saturdays from 12:00 pm to 2:00 pm on all of Bauer Place stations in Scotland.

Overview
The show counts down Scotland's most 20 bought, streamed, downloaded and requested songs of the week with two 'One To Watch' future hits as well as 'Former UK Number One' songs.

Scotland's Hot 20